Janet Elsdon Mackey  (née Craig; born 14 June 1953) is a New Zealand politician. She was a Member of the New Zealand Parliament for the Labour Party from 1993 until 2005.

Early life and family
Mackey was born in Auckland on 14 June 1953, the daughter of Elsdon Walter Grant Craig and Zeta Harriet Craig (née Brown). Her father is a Scottish-New Zealander, and the nephew of Elsdon Best, and her mother is from Northern Ireland. Mackey was educated at Auckland Girls' Grammar School from 1966 to 1969, and went on to study at the University of Auckland, graduating with a Bachelor of Arts in English.

Previously married, Mackey has three children, including Moana Mackey, who has also served as a Labour MP.

Parliamentary career

She was first elected to Parliament in the 1993 election, winning the seat of Gisborne. In the 1996 election, she won the newly created seat of Mahia, and in the 1999 and 2002 elections, she won the seat of East Coast. In 2003, she was joined in Parliament by her daughter, Moana Mackey. Before entering politics, she was a real estate agent.

She announced her intent to retire before the 2005 election, and did not stand for re-election.

Other activities
Mackey served as a trustee of the Trust Bank Eastern and Central Community Trust, and from 1984 to 1990 was chair of the East Coast Regional Employment and Access Council. She was appointed as a justice of the peace in 1988, and became a marriage celebrant in 1989.

References

|-

|-

1953 births
Living people
New Zealand Labour Party MPs
People from Auckland
New Zealand people of Irish descent
New Zealand people of Scottish descent
Women members of the New Zealand House of Representatives
New Zealand real estate agents
New Zealand MPs for North Island electorates
Members of the New Zealand House of Representatives
21st-century New Zealand politicians
21st-century New Zealand women politicians
People educated at Auckland Girls' Grammar School
University of Auckland alumni
New Zealand justices of the peace